Michael Julian Johnson (born June 4, 1986) is an American professional mixed martial artist. Johnson currently fights in the Lightweight division for the Ultimate Fighting Championship (UFC). A professional MMA competitor since 2008, Johnson mostly competed in his regional circuit, before signing onto the Ultimate Fighting Championship to appear on The Ultimate Fighter: Team GSP vs. Team Koscheck, in which he was the runner-up.

Background
Johnson was born in St. Louis, Missouri, on June 4, 1986. He was raised as the youngest of three siblings. Johnson began fighting at the age of 10, after his father's fatal heart attack. The incident made Johnson want to exert his anger physically. Johnson later said, "I lost something, a huge part of me....Fighting was my way of not dealing with my dad's passing. Now that I think of it, of course, it was the wrong thing to do, especially putting all that burden on my mom having to deal with it." Athletic, Johnson was a three-sport varsity athlete at Marquette High School in Chesterfield, Missouri. Johnson later received a full scholarship to play football at Central Methodist University, but transferred after one year to Meramec Community College, where he was one of the top NJCAA wrestlers in the country.

Mixed martial arts career

Early career
Johnson is a former Midwest Fight League and Xtreme Cage Fighting Champion who won those titles in July 2008 and October 2009, respectively.

The Ultimate Fighter
Johnson then signed onto the Ultimate Fighting Championship circuit to appear on The Ultimate Fighter: Team GSP vs. Team Koscheck.

Johnson's entry into the show was, in part, due to his persistence in attending tryouts for the show. After making the final interview round of The Ultimate Fighter: Team Nogueira vs. Team Mir, Johnson was told that he wasn't the right fit for the show. Johnson then tried out for the ninth season of the show, before finally becoming accepted onto the twelfth season after telling the producers, "I've been getting tired of chasing you [expletive] around the country. I'm here; I'm not going to go anywhere. If you guys don't pick me, I'm going to try out again." Finally, Johnson was signed.

Johnson's first fight took place on the debut episode of the season, where he faced unbeaten Pablo Garza. Johnson scored a unanimous decision victory, which moved him into the house.

In the second episode, both St-Pierre and Koscheck had Johnson at the top of their lists when it came time to select fighters. During the team selection process, however, St-Pierre created a fake list that did not have Johnson among his top selections and subtly showed it to Koscheck to fool him into believing it. This seemed to manipulate Koscheck into picking Marc Stevens, as he may have believed he could take Johnson later. This allowed St-Pierre to choose Johnson with the second overall pick.

Johnson competed in his preliminary round matchup against Aaron Wilkinson in the third episode. After some early striking exchanges in the first round, Wilkinson was able to take Johnson down and utilize ground-and-pound punches and elbows. In the second round, Johnson landed an early superman punch, as well as a takedown. After takedowns were achieved by both men, Johnson stuffed a final attempt and took the second round on the judges' scorecards. In the sudden victory round, Johnson attacked quickly, which allowed him to end the fight via a rear-naked choke.

In episode 8, Team GSP had to pick which team members would fight each other (considering they had 5 members in the quarter-finals). St. Pierre asked each member to pick the fighter they wanted to fight. Johnson and Alex Caceres picked each other and a fight was scheduled. Johnson won by unanimous decision after two rounds, earning himself a spot in the semi-finals.

In the final round, Johnson faced the one remaining Team Koscheck member, Nam Phan. In a back-and-forth fight, Johnson scored takedowns. The consensus after the fight was that Johnson won the opening round, and Phan the second. The third was in dispute, however, with each fighter's coach convinced they had won the round. Johnson was declared the winner via split decision.

Ultimate Fighting Championship

2010
Johnson made his UFC debut in The Ultimate Fighter: Team GSP vs. Team Koscheck Finale against Jonathan Brookins. That fight determined the winner of The Ultimate Fighter 12. After an impressive first round, Johnson lost rounds two and three — and subsequently the fight — via unanimous decision, leaving him the runner-up.

2011
Johnson was looking to take a fight outside of the UFC before returning to the promotion. The fight was to headline the North American Fighting Championship card against Jim Bleau. However, after obtaining a UFC fight, Johnson pulled out of the NAFC bout to focus his training on the UFC bout. Johnson faced Edward Faaloloto on June 26, 2011, at UFC on Versus 4 and won the fight via TKO in the first round.

Johnson faced Paul Sass on October 1, 2011, at UFC on Versus 6. He lost the fight via submission in the first round.

2012
Johnson was expected to face Cody McKenzie on January 28, 2012, at UFC on Fox 2. However, McKenzie was forced out of the bout with an injury, and he was replaced by Shane Roller. Johnson defeated Roller by unanimous decision, with all three judges scoring the bout 29–28.

Johnson faced Tony Ferguson on May 5, 2012, at UFC on Fox 3, replacing an injured Thiago Tavares. Johnson won the fight via unanimous decision.

Johnson was expected to face Danny Castillo on September 1, 2012, at UFC 151. However, after UFC 151 was cancelled, Johnson/Castillo was rescheduled and took place on October 5, 2012, at UFC on FX 5. After almost being finished in the first round, Johnson survived and came back to win via KO at 1:06 into the second round. Johnson was awarded Knockout of the Night honors for his performance.

Johnson fought Myles Jury on December 29, 2012, at UFC 155. He lost the fight via unanimous decision.

2013
Johnson faced Reza Madadi on April 6, 2013, at UFC on Fuel TV 9. Despite almost finishing Madadi with a head kick in the first round, Johnson eventually succumbed to the wrestling of Madadi and lost the fight via submission in the third round.

Johnson faced Joe Lauzon on August 17, 2013, at UFC Fight Night 26. He won the fight via unanimous decision after outstriking Lauzon for all three rounds.

Johnson faced Gleison Tibau on December 28, 2013, at UFC 168. He won the fight by knockout in the second round.

2014
Due to an injury to Ross Pearson, Johnson stepped in to face Melvin Guillard at UFC Fight Night 37. Johnson won the fight via unanimous decision.

Johnson was expected to face Josh Thomson on July 26, 2014, at UFC on Fox 12. However, on July 11, the UFC announced he had been pulled from the bout. It was later revealed that Johnson was pulled from the bout and would not compete during the remainder of 2014 his arrest in Palm Beach County, Florida in April 2014.

2015
Johnson faced Edson Barboza on February 22, 2015, at UFC Fight Night 61. He won the bout by unanimous decision.

A bout with Benson Henderson was initially linked as the event headliner for The Ultimate Fighter 21 Finale on July 12, 2015. Although never officially announced by the UFC, the bout between Henderson and Johnson will not take place at this event.

Johnson faced Beneil Dariush on August 8, 2015, at UFC Fight Night 73. He lost the fight via a controversial split decision. Every mainstream MMA media outlet polled by MMA Decisions scored the fight as decision victory for Johnson.

Johnson faced Nate Diaz on December 19, 2015, at UFC on Fox 17. He lost the fight by unanimous decision. Both participants were awarded Fight of the Night honors.

2016
A rematch with Tony Ferguson was expected to take place on March 5, 2016, at UFC 196. However, on January 27, it was announced that Johnson withdrew from the bout due to an injury.

Johnson faced Dustin Poirier on September 17, 2016, at UFC Fight Night 94. He won the fight via knockout early in the first round with a sharp two-punch combination followed by ground and pound. This win earned Johnson his first Performance of the Night bonus award.

Johnson next faced Khabib Nurmagomedov on November 12, 2016, at UFC 205. He lost the fight via submission in the third round.

2017
Johnson faced former World Series of Fighting champion Justin Gaethje on July 7, 2017, in the main event at The Ultimate Fighter 25 Finale. Rocking Gaethje twice with punches, Johnson was not able to capitalize and lost the fight via TKO with a combination of punches and knees in the second round. The fight earned Johnson his second Fight of the Night bonus award.

2018
Johnson faced Darren Elkins in a featherweight bout on January 14, 2018, at UFC Fight Night: Stephens vs. Choi. He lost the fight in round two via submission.

Johnson faced Andre Fili on August 25, 2018, at UFC Fight Night 135. He won the fight via split decision.

Johnson faced Artem Lobov on October 27, 2018, at UFC Fight Night 138. At weight-ins, Johnson weighed in at 147 pounds, one pounds over the featherweight limit of 146 pounds. As a result, the fight proceeded at a catchweight bout and Johnson was to forfeit 20% of his purse to Lobov, however Lobov refused to take the money. Johnson defeated Lobov by unanimous decision.

Consecutive Losses
Johnson faced Josh Emmett on March 30, 2019, at UFC on ESPN 2. Despite being up on the judges scorecards, Johnson lost the fight via knockout late in the third round.

Johnson faced Stevie Ray at UFC on ESPN+ 20 on October 26, 2019. He lost the fight via majority decision.

Johnson  was scheduled to face Evan Dunham on April 25, 2020. However, due to the COVID-19 pandemic event, Johnson  was rescheduled to face Khama Worthy at UFC 249. In turn, the bout was postponed to a future date. However, the event was cancelled. However, on April 9, Dana White, the president of UFC announced that this event was postponed to a future date.  Instead Johnson faced Thiago Moisés on May 13, 2020, at UFC Fight Night: Smith vs. Teixeira. After outstriking Moisés in the first round, he lost the fight via submission less than thirty seconds into the second round.

Johnson faced Clay Guida on February 6, 2021, at UFC Fight Night 184. He lost the fight via unanimous decision.

Return to victory
Johnson was scheduled to face Alan Patrick on May 7, 2022, at UFC 274. However, the bout was pushed back one week to UFC on ESPN: Błachowicz vs. Rakić for undisclosed reasons. Johnson won the fight via knockout in the second round, snapping his three year long losing streak and getting his first knockout victory since 2016 in the process.

Johnson faced Jamie Mullarkey on July 9, 2022, at UFC on ESPN: dos Anjos vs. Fiziev. He lost the fight via controversial split decision. 15 out of 19 media outlets scored the fight in favor of Johnson. The bout earned the Fight of the Night bonus award.

Johnson faced Marc Diakiese on December 3, 2022, at UFC on ESPN 42. He won the bout via unanimous decision.

Personal life
Johnson trained at Springfield Fight Club, which is an affiliate of Gracie Barra based in Springfield, Missouri. Johnson also worked there as the assistant mixed martial arts coach.

On April 9, 2014, Johnson was arrested in Palm Beach County, Florida following a domestic dispute. He was charged with misdemeanor domestic battery and later released on bail. The 
charge was eventually dropped.

Championships and accomplishments

Mixed martial arts
Ultimate Fighting Championship
Fight of the Night (Three times) 
Knockout of the Night (One time) 
Performance of the Night (One time) 
Xtreme Cage Fighting
XCF Lightweight Championship (One time)
Midwest Fight League
MFL Lightweight Championship (One time)
 Sherdog
 2017 Fight of the Year vs. Justin Gaethje* 2017 Round of the Year (Round 2) vs.  Justin Gaethje
 Bleacher Report
 2017 Fight of the Year vs. Justin Gaethje
 CBS Sports
 2017 Fight of the Year vs. Justin Gaethje
 MMAjunkie.com
 2017 Round of the Year (Round one) vs. Justin Gaethje
 Bloody Elbow
 2017 Best Fight of the Year vs. Justin Gaethje
 Cageside Press
 2017 Fight of the Year vs. Justin Gaethje

Mixed martial arts record

|-
|Win
|align=center|21–18
|Marc Diakiese
|Decision (unanimous)
|UFC on ESPN: Thompson vs. Holland
|
|align=center|3
|align=center|5:00
|Orlando, Florida, United States
|
|-
|Loss
|align=center|20–18
|Jamie Mullarkey
|Decision (split)
|UFC on ESPN: dos Anjos vs. Fiziev
|
|align=center|3
|align=center|5:00
|Las Vegas, Nevada, United States
|
|-
|Win
|align=center|20–17
|Alan Patrick 
|KO (punches)
|UFC on ESPN: Błachowicz vs. Rakić 
| 
|align=center|2
|align=center|3:22
|Las Vegas, Nevada, United States
|
|-
|Loss
|align=center|19–17
|Clay Guida
|Decision (unanimous)
|UFC Fight Night: Overeem vs. Volkov
|
|align=center|3
|align=center|5:00
|Las Vegas, Nevada, United States
|
|-
|Loss
|align=center|19–16
|Thiago Moisés
|Submission (achilles lock)
|UFC Fight Night: Smith vs. Teixeira
|
|align=center|2
|align=center|0:25
|Jacksonville, Florida, United States
|
|-
|Loss
|align=center|19–15
|Stevie Ray
|Decision (majority)
|UFC Fight Night: Maia vs. Askren 
|
|align=center|3
|align=center|5:00
|Kallang, Singapore
|
|-
|Loss
|align=center|19–14
|Josh Emmett
|KO (punch)
|UFC on ESPN: Barboza vs. Gaethje
|
|align=center|3
|align=center|4:14
|Philadelphia, Pennsylvania, United States
|
|-
|Win
|align=center|19–13
|Artem Lobov
|Decision (unanimous)
|UFC Fight Night: Volkan vs. Smith
|
|align=center|3
|align=center|5:00
|Moncton, New Brunswick, Canada
|
|-
|Win
|align=center|18–13
|Andre Fili
|Decision (split)
|UFC Fight Night: Gaethje vs. Vick
|
|align=center|3
|align=center|5:00
|Lincoln, Nebraska, United States
|
|-
|Loss
|align=center|17–13
|Darren Elkins
|Submission (rear-naked choke)
|UFC Fight Night: Stephens vs. Choi
|
|align=center|2
|align=center|2:22
|St. Louis, Missouri, United States
|
|-
|Loss
|align=center|17–12
|Justin Gaethje
|TKO (punches and knees)
|The Ultimate Fighter: Redemption Finale
|
|align=center|2
|align=center|4:48
|Las Vegas, Nevada, United States
|
|-
|Loss
|align=center|17–11
|Khabib Nurmagomedov
|Submission (kimura)
|UFC 205
|
|align=center|3
|align=center|2:31
|New York City, New York, United States
|
|-
|Win
|align=center|17–10
|Dustin Poirier
|KO (punches) 
|UFC Fight Night: Poirier vs. Johnson
|
|align=center|1
|align=center|1:35
|Hidalgo, Texas, United States
|
|-
| Loss
| align=center| 16–10
| Nate Diaz
| Decision (unanimous)
| UFC on Fox: dos Anjos vs. Cowboy 2
| 
| align=center|3
| align=center|5:00
| Orlando, Florida, United States
| 
|-
| Loss
| align=center| 16–9
| Beneil Dariush
| Decision (split)
| UFC Fight Night: Teixeira vs. Saint Preux
| 
| align=center| 3
| align=center| 5:00
| Nashville, Tennessee, United States
|
|-
| Win
| align=center| 16–8
| Edson Barboza
| Decision (unanimous)
| UFC Fight Night: Bigfoot vs. Mir
| 
| align=center| 3
| align=center| 5:00
| Porto Alegre, Brazil
|
|-
| Win
| align=center| 15–8
| Melvin Guillard
| Decision (unanimous)
| UFC Fight Night: Gustafsson vs. Manuwa
| 
| align=center| 3
| align=center| 5:00
| London, England
| 
|-
| Win
| align=center| 14–8
| Gleison Tibau
| KO (punches)
| UFC 168
| 
| align=center| 2
| align=center| 1:32
| Las Vegas, Nevada, United States
| 
|-
| Win
| align=center| 13–8
| Joe Lauzon
| Decision (unanimous)
| UFC Fight Night: Shogun vs. Sonnen
| 
| align=center| 3
| align=center| 5:00
| Boston, Massachusetts, United States
| 
|-
| Loss
| align=center| 12–8
| Reza Madadi
| Submission (D'Arce choke)
| UFC on Fuel TV: Mousasi vs. Latifi
| 
| align=center| 3
| align=center| 1:33
| Stockholm, Sweden
| 
|-
| Loss
| align=center| 12–7
| Myles Jury
| Decision (unanimous)
| UFC 155
| 
| align=center| 3
| align=center| 5:00
| Las Vegas, Nevada, United States
| 
|-
| Win
| align=center| 12–6
| Danny Castillo
| KO (punches)
| UFC on FX: Browne vs. Bigfoot
| 
| align=center| 2
| align=center| 1:06
| Minneapolis, Minnesota, United States
| 
|-
| Win
| align=center| 11–6
| Tony Ferguson
| Decision (unanimous)
| UFC on Fox: Diaz vs. Miller
| 
| align=center| 3
| align=center| 5:00
| East Rutherford, New Jersey, United States
| 
|-
| Win
| align=center| 10–6
| Shane Roller
| Decision (unanimous)
| UFC on Fox: Evans vs. Davis
| 
| align=center| 3
| align=center| 5:00
| Chicago, Illinois, United States
| 
|-
| Loss
| align=center| 9–6
| Paul Sass
| Submission (heel hook)
| UFC Live: Cruz vs. Johnson
| 
| align=center| 1
| align=center| 3:00
| Washington, D.C., United States
| 
|-
| Win
| align=center| 9–5
| Edward Faaloloto
| TKO (punches)
| UFC Live: Kongo vs. Barry
| 
| align=center| 1
| align=center| 4:42
| Pittsburgh, Pennsylvania, United States
| 
|-
| Loss
| align=center| 8–5
| Jonathan Brookins
| Decision (unanimous)
| The Ultimate Fighter: Team GSP vs. Team Koscheck Finale
| 
| align=center| 3
| align=center| 5:00
| Las Vegas, Nevada, United States
| 
|-
| Win
| align=center| 8–4
| Chris McDaniel
| TKO (punches)
| FM: Productions
| 
| align=center| 1
| align=center| 4:34
| Springfield, Missouri, United States
| 
|-
| Win
| align=center| 7–4
| Ramiro Hernandez
| Decision (unanimous)
| Titan Fighting Championship 15
| 
| align=center| 3
| align=center| 5:00
| Kansas City, Kansas, United States
| 
|-
| Win
| align=center| 6–4
| Aaron Derrow
| TKO (punches)
| Xtreme Cage Fighter 10
| 
| align=center| 1
| align=center| 0:43
| Springfield, Missouri, United States
| 
|-
| Loss
| align=center| 5–4
| Eric Marriott
| Submission (heel hook)
| FM: Productions
| 
| align=center| 2
| align=center| 1:32
| Springfield, Missouri, United States
| 
|-
| Win
| align=center| 5–3
| Clay French
| Submission (kimura)
| Fuel Fight Club
| 
| align=center| 1
| align=center| 3:16
| Lake Ozark, Missouri, United States
| 
|-
| Loss
| align=center| 4–3
| Joe Brammer
| Submission (guillotine choke)
| Midwest Cage Championships 19
| 
| align=center| 4
| align=center| 3:45
| Des Moines, Iowa, United States
| 
|-
| Loss
| align=center| 4–2
| James Krause
| Submission (triangle choke)
| FM: Productions
| 
| align=center| 1
| align=center| 2:55
| Springfield, Missouri, United States
| 
|-
| Win
| align=center| 4–1
| Warren Stewart
| TKO (punches)
| FM: Productions
| 
| align=center| 1
| align=center| 2:37
| Springfield, Missouri, United States
| 
|-
| Win
| align=center| 3–1
| Lucas Gwaltney
| Decision (majority)
| Midwest Fight League
| 
| align=center| 3
| align=center| 5:00
| Columbia, Missouri, United States
| 
|-
| Loss
| align=center| 2–1
| Ted Worthington
| Submission (triangle choke)
| MCC 13: Contenders
| 
| align=center| 3
| align=center| 1:29
| Urbandale, Iowa, United States
| 
|-
| Win
| align=center| 2–0
| Steve Schneider
| Submission (choke) 
| FM: Productions
| 
| align=center| 1
| align=center| 2:12
| Springfield, Missouri, United States
| 
|-
| Win
| align=center| 1–0
| Chauncey Prather
| TKO (punches)
| FM: Productions
| 
| align=center| 1
| align=center| 1:12
| Springfield, Missouri, United States
|

Mixed martial arts exhibition record

| Win
| align=center| 4–0
| Nam Phan
| Decision (split)
| The Ultimate Fighter: Team GSP vs. Team Koscheck
|  (airdate)
| align=center| 3
| align=center| 5:00
| Las Vegas, Nevada, United States
| 
|-
| Win
| align=center| 3–0
| Alex Caceres
| Decision (unanimous)
| The Ultimate Fighter: Team GSP vs. Team Koscheck
|  (airdate)
| align=center| 2
| align=center| 5:00
| Las Vegas, Nevada, United States
| 
|-
| Win
| align=center| 2–0
| Aaron Wilkinson
| Submission (rear-naked choke)
| The Ultimate Fighter: Team GSP vs. Team Koscheck
|  (airdate)
| align=center| 3
| align=center| 0:39
| Las Vegas, Nevada, United States
| 
|-
| Win
| align=center| 1–0
| Pablo Garza
| Decision (unanimous)
| The Ultimate Fighter: Team GSP vs. Team Koscheck
|  (airdate)
| align=center| 2
| align=center| 5:00
| Las Vegas, Nevada, United States
|

See also
 List of current UFC fighters
 List of male mixed martial artists

References

External links

American male mixed martial artists
Mixed martial artists from Missouri
Sportspeople from St. Louis
Lightweight mixed martial artists
African-American mixed martial artists
Mixed martial artists utilizing collegiate wrestling
1986 births
Living people
People from Lantana, Florida
Ultimate Fighting Championship male fighters
American male sport wrestlers
Amateur wrestlers
21st-century African-American sportspeople
20th-century African-American people